In the United States, National Engineers Week is always the week in February which encompasses George Washington's actual birthday, February 22. It is observed by more than 70 engineering, education, and cultural societies, and more than 50 corporations and government agencies. The purpose of National Engineers Week is to call attention to the contributions to society that engineers make. It is also a time for engineers to emphasize the importance of learning math, science, and technical skills.

The celebration of National Engineers Week was started in 1951 by the National Society of Professional Engineers in conjunction with President George Washington's birthday. President Washington is considered as the nation's first engineer, notably for his survey work. Prior to the start of National Engineers Week, the University of Missouri College of Engineering began celebrating the world's first Engineers' Week in 1903, 48 years before the National Society of Professional Engineers, with St. Patrick as the patron saint of engineers.

The results of the Federal Engineer of the Year Award are announced during the week.

Dates
 2007 — February 18–24
 2008 — February 17–23
 2009 — February 15–21 (to coincide with the Washingtons Birthday Observance (United States), rather than Washington's actual birthday)
 2010 — February 14–20 (to coincide with the Washington’s Birthday observance, rather than Washington's actual birthday)
 2011 — February 20–26
 2012 — February 19–25
 2013 — February 17–23
 2014 — February 16–22
 2015 — February 22–28
 2016 — February 21–27
 2017 — February 19–25
 2018 — February 18-24
 2019 — February 17-23 
 2020 — February 16-22
 2021 — February 21-27
 2022 — February 20-26
 2023 — February 19-25
 2024 — February 18-24
 2025 — February 16-22

References

External links
http://www.discovere.org/

February observances